Nandana or Nandna is a village and panchayat in Thathri of Doda district in the union territory of Jammu and Kashmir. Nandana is located in the hilly area of Doda district and have deep gorges.

References 

Villages in Doda district
Doda district
Chenab Valley